King Kaazi is an American singer, composer, and songwriter. He was born in India.

References 

Year of birth missing (living people)
Living people
Indian emigrants to the United States
American male singers of Indian descent
American composers
American singer-songwriters